Graphigona is a monotypic moth genus in the family Erebidae erected by Francis Walker in 1857. Its only species, Graphigona regina, was first described by Achille Guenée in 1852. It is found in Colombia and Brazil.

References

Calpinae
Monotypic moth genera